Grzegorz Kaszak (born 24 February 1964) is the Bishop of Sosnowiec since his ordination on 28 March 2009. He had previously served as Secretary of the Pontifical Council for the Family.

Kaszak was born in Choszczno, Poland (Archdiocese of Szczecin-Kamień). After his studies at the Major Seminary of Szczecin, he was ordained as a priest on 18 June 1989.

For six months he pursued the ministry as chaplain in the parish of Saint Adalbert in Świnoujście-Warszów, then went to Rome and began his studies of moral theology at the Pontifical University of the Holy Cross. From 1992 to 2002, he worked at the Pontifical Council for the Family. He received his doctorate in 1998 with a thesis entitled "Love and responsible contraception in catechesis of John Paul II."

From 2002 until 2007 was rector of the Pontifical Ecclesiastical Polish Institute in Rome. He was appointed as Secretary of the Pontifical Council for the Family by Pope Benedict in November 2007. He was ordained on 28 March after he was appointed as bishop of Sosnowiec.

On 22 October 2009 Jean Laffitte was appointed as secretary of the Pontifical Council for the Family, filling the vacancy left by Bishop Kaszak.

References

Living people
1964 births
21st-century Roman Catholic bishops in Poland
Pontifical Council for the Family
Pontifical University of the Holy Cross alumni
People from Choszczno County